The .450/400 Nitro Express  is a Nitro Express rifle cartridge that is produced in three case lengths: 2-inches, 3 inches and 3-inches, and is intended for use in single shot and double rifles. The 3-inch and 3-inch versions are considered classic Nitro Express cartridges.

Development
Both the .450/400 2-inch NE and .450/400 3-inch NE were created by loading the .450/400 Black Powder Express cartridges of both case lengths with smokeless cordite.

.450/400 2-inch Nitro Express
The .450/400 2 inch Nitro Express was loaded with a 400 gr. RN bullet with 42 or 43 grains of cordite and was meant for use in newer rifles chambered for the .450/400 2  inch case as this loading generates greater pressure than the Black Powder Express versions of the cartridge.

.450/400 3-inch Nitro Express
This cartridge is better known as the .400 Jeffery Nitro Express.

.450/400 3-inch Nitro Express
The .450/400 3-inch NE conversion was not initially entirely successful, under the increased pressures of the cordite loading the long neck could stick in the chamber causing the rim to pull off at extraction, a problem not encountered under the milder black powder loadings.  To counter this, the rim was increased in thickness to .042-inches.  W.J. Jeffery & Co further improved the cartridge by reducing the length of the case to 3-inches and moving the neck further forward, creating the .450/400 3-inch NE.

Additionally, the caliber had to be standardised, slight variations existed in both the rifles and the  low-pressure black powder cartridges produced by different manufacturers, the bullet diameter is nominally given as .405 inches, bore as large as .411 existed, not a significant problem in black-powder rifles.  In Nitro Express loadings, an undersized bullet in an oversized bore may experience accuracy issues while an oversized bullet fired in an undersized bore may cause a catastrophic failure in the firearm.

This cartridge is considered unsafe to use for older rifles chambered for the black powder version of this cartridge due to higher pressures generated by this loading. .450/400 3-inch Nitro Express rifles are heavier and were considered as the minimum cartridge necessary when hunting dangerous game.

Use
The .450/400 NE in both the 3-inch and 3-inch versions were extremely popular in Africa and India, prior to the introduction of the .375 Holland & Holland they were considered the best all-round African hunting caliber.  Both cartridges were extremely popular in India with Maharajas and British sportsmen for hunting tiger.

In his African Rifles and Cartridges, John "Pondoro" Taylor stated the 3-inch and 3-inch .450/400 NE were adequate for all African game in almost all conditions when used by an experienced hunter.

See also
Nitro Express
 List of rifle cartridges
 10 mm caliber other cartridges of similar caliber size.

References

Footnotes

Bibliography
 Barnes, Frank C, Cartridges of the World, ed 13, Gun Digest Books, Iola, 2012, .
 Kynoch Ammunition, Big Game Cartridges kynochammunition.co.uk
 Roberts, Paul, Nitro big game rifles, retrieved 13 Nov 15.
 Taylor, John, African rifles and cartridges, Sportsman's Vintage Press, 2013, .

External links

 The 450/400 Nitro Express
 450/400 3 " NITRO EXPRESS
 Power, Accuracy and Beauty: Verney-Carron Azur .450/400 3" Nitro Express
 

Pistol and rifle cartridges
British firearm cartridges